"Could You Be Loved" is a 1980 song by Jamaican reggae band Bob Marley and the Wailers. It was released as the first single from their twelfth and last album, Uprising (1980), and is also included on their greatest-hits album Legend (1984). It was written in 1979 on an aeroplane while The Wailers were experimenting on guitar. In the middle of the song, background singers quote a verse from Bob Marley's first single "Judge Not": "The road of life is rocky; And you may stumble too. So while you point your fingers, someone else is judging you". Instruments used on the original record of this song are guitars, bass, drums, acoustic piano, the Hohner clavinet and an organ, as well as the Brazilian cuíca. "Could You be Loved" was very successful on the charts in Europe, peaking within the top 10 in Belgium, France, Ireland, Italy, the Netherlands, Norway, Spain, Switzerland and the UK. Additionally, it was a top 20 hit in Sweden and West Germany.

Impact and legacy
American magazine Rolling Stone included "Could You Be Loved" at number 363 in their list of "500 Best Songs of All Time" in 2021.

Track listings
 7" single
"Could You Be Loved" – 3:35	
"One Drop" – 3:50

 7" single
"Could You Be Loved" – 3:35	
"No Woman, No Cry (Live '75)" – 3:57

Charts

Weekly charts

Year-end charts

Certifications

Joe Cocker version

British singer Joe Cocker covered "Could You Be Loved" on his 1997 album Across from Midnight. The single peaked at number one in Hungary.

Track listings
 CD single
"Could You Be Loved" (Single Version) – 4:35	
"Could You Be Loved" (Radio Edit) – 4:18	
"The Way Her Love Is" – 2:44

Charts

Cover versions
Marley's four eldest children Ziggy Marley and the Melody Makers have performed the song numerous times during their tours. Their performance versions appear on the concert DVDs "Ziggy Marley and the Melody Makers Live", "Marley Magic: Live in Central Park at Summerstage", "One Love: The Bob Marley All-Star Tribute", and their live album "Live Vol. 1".

References

1980 songs
1980 singles
1997 singles
Bob Marley songs
Island Records singles
Joe Cocker songs
Songs written by Bob Marley
Disco songs
Number-one singles in Hungary